Cho Byung-kuk (born July 1, 1981) is a South Korean international football player who is the currently assistant coach of Indonesia and Indonesia U-23.

Career
Cho began his professional career in 2002 with K-League club Suwon Samsung Bluewings. He moved to Chunnam Dragons at the end of the 2004 season in a swap deal which saw Kim Nam-Il move to Suwon. In August 2005, he joined Seongnam Ilhwa Chunma.

He was part of the South Korea football team in 2004 Summer Olympics, who finished second in Group A, making it through to the next round, before being defeated by silver medal winners Paraguay.

In May 2010, he left team to do military service.

On 10 January 2014, Cho transferred to Chinese Super League side Shanghai Greenland Shenhua and becomes the first ever South Korean player in history of the Chinese club.

Club statistics

International goals
Results list South Korea's goal tally first.

See also
List of Koreans
South Korea national football team

References

External links
 
 Cha Du-ri – National Team stats at KFA 
 
 
 

1981 births
Living people
Association football defenders
South Korean footballers
South Korean expatriate footballers
South Korea international footballers
Suwon Samsung Bluewings players
Seongnam FC players
Vegalta Sendai players
Júbilo Iwata players
Shanghai Shenhua F.C. players
Gyeongnam FC players
Suwon FC players
K League 1 players
K League 2 players
J1 League players
Footballers at the 2004 Summer Olympics
Olympic footballers of South Korea
Expatriate footballers in Japan
South Korean expatriate sportspeople in Japan
Expatriate footballers in China
South Korean expatriate sportspeople in China
Sportspeople from Ulsan
Yonsei University alumni
Chinese Super League players
Cho Byung-kuk
Expatriate footballers in Thailand
South Korean expatriate sportspeople in Thailand
Cho Byung-kuk
Asian Games medalists in football
Footballers at the 2002 Asian Games
Asian Games bronze medalists for South Korea
Medalists at the 2002 Asian Games